Mahat is an Ekthariya (single-clan) Chhetri surname among Nepalese, of Khasa heritage. The name may have originated when one of the Jumli Malla kings in medieval times made his younger brother, Dharma Malla, chief of staff in the army. This granted Dharma Malla the title of Mahat (meaning The Great One), and as a result, his descendants started using 'Mahat' as their surnames.

Like other Khasa chetris such as Thapa, Basnyat/Basnet, Karki, Khadka and Rawat, Mahats worship Masta, a local non-vedic deity of the Karnali region. Among twelve Mastas, Khaapar Masta is their Kuldevata. Khasa Chhetris are referred to by their place of origin, and therefore Mahats are also called as Kalikote Mahat.

Military roles

Mahats have been an integral part of the Nepalese Army during the same period of Shah kings. Many individuals with the Mahat surname still serve the Nepalese Army as well as in the Indian and US armies in different designations, both as officers and non-officers.

Population and distribution

At the time of the 1991 Nepal census, there were 4,240 Mahats living in 799 dwellings. The most prominent population of Mahat is Mahat Gaun in Jumla. Notable settlements of Mahats have been found in Nuwakot, Parbat, Tanahu, Jumla (Mahat Village Development Committee which now falls under Chandan Nath Municipality), Rukum, Parbat, Myagdi, Pokhara (Mahat gauda), Nuwakot (Kabilash and Kholegaun), Tanahun, Kabhre (Panauti), Bhaktapur(Palanse Mahatgaun), Lalitpur (Lele, Satdobato, Thaiba), Makwanpur (Hetauda), Charikot and Ilam (Sangrumba, Hattidhunga, Khammang, Ilam municipality).

The Mahats living in Lele of Lalitpur are believed to have settled there from the Valley Malla after the Khasa attack on Kathmandu led by Khas king Jitari Malla. Mahats also live in places like Jhapa (Mechinagar/ Kakarbhitta, Sanischare, Damak), Sunsari (Dharan, Paanmara), Darchula (Marma, Duhun), Baitadi and outside Nepal in West Bengal (Bagrakot) and Assam in India.

Notable Mahats 

Prem Raja Mahat, Nepalese folk singer
Gajendra Bahadur Mahat (Jumla), Nepalese politician
Leyla Mahat, Kazakhstani artist
Dr. Prakash Sharan Mahat (Nuwakot), Foreign Minister in Nepal Government
 Dr. Ram Sharan Mahat (Nuwakot) — Senior Leader of Nepalese Congress, Finance Minister in Nepal Government (Brother of Prakash Sharan Mahat)

References

Surnames of Nepalese origin
Khas surnames